Islington South was a parliamentary constituency in the Metropolitan Borough of Islington in North London.  It returned one Member of Parliament (MP)  to the House of Commons of the Parliament of the United Kingdom.

The constituency was created for the 1885 general election, and abolished for the 1950 general election.

Boundaries

1885–1918
 The constituency was defined as comprising 3 wards of the parish of Islington: Barnsbury, St Mary and St Peter. These wards were used for the election of vestryman under the Metropolis Management Act 1855.

1918–1950

Under the Representation of the People Act 1918 constituencies in the County of London were redefined in terms of the Metropolitan Boroughs created in 1900. The constituency was defined as comprising three wards of the Metropolitan Borough of Islington having the same names as the previous wards: Barnsbury, St Mary and St Peter.

Members of Parliament

Elections

Elections in the 1880s

Elections in the 1890s

Elections in the 1900s

Elections in the 1910s 

General Election 1914–15:

Another General Election was required to take place before the end of 1915. The political parties had been making preparations for an election to take place and by the July 1914, the following candidates had been selected; 
Liberal: Thomas Wiles
Unionist:

Elections in the 1920s

Elections in the 1930s 

General Election 1939–40

Another General Election was required to take place before the end of 1940. The political parties had been making preparations for an election to take place and by the Autumn of 1939, the following candidates had been selected; 
Labour: William Cluse
Conservative: Tom Howard

Elections in the 1940s

See also
Islington constituencies

Notes and References

Notes

References

 British Parliamentary Election Results 1885-1918, compiled and edited by F.W.S. Craig (Macmillan Press 1974)
 Debrett’s Illustrated Heraldic and Biographical House of Commons and the Judicial Bench 1886
 Debrett’s House of Commons and the Judicial Bench 1901
 Debrett’s House of Commons and the Judicial Bench 1918

Parliamentary constituencies in London (historic)
Constituencies of the Parliament of the United Kingdom established in 1885
Constituencies of the Parliament of the United Kingdom disestablished in 1950
Politics of the London Borough of Islington